Skipsfjorden or Skipfjorden is a fjord or bay in Karlsøy Municipality in Troms og Finnmark county, Norway.

The mouth of the fjord stretches from the mountain Kuhammaren on the west to the Skotallneset peninsula on the east. There are some farms in the inner part of the Skipsfjorden, but none of them have road access to the rest of the island. Some of the farms include Røyrnes, Skipsfjord, and Sandmo.

References

Karlsøy
Fjords of Troms og Finnmark